The Assiniboia Regiment was an infantry regiment of the Non-Permanent Active Militia of the Canadian Militia. In 1936, the regiment was converted to artillery and today forms part of the 10th Field Artillery Regiment, RCA.

History 
On 6 August 1914, details from the 95th Saskatchewan Regiment were placed on active service for local protection duties.

On 15 July 1916, the 217th (Qu'Appelle) Battalion, CEF was authorized for service, and on 2 June 1917, the battalion embarked for Great Britain. After its arrival in the UK, on 9 June 1917, the battalion’s personnel were absorbed by the 19th Reserve Battalion, CEF, to provide reinforcements for the Canadian Corps in the field. On 1 September 1917, the 217th Battalion was disbanded.

Through the 217th Battalion, the regiment was awarded two battle honours:

 Amiens
 Arras, 1918

Until its conversion into artillery in 1936 the regiment perpetuated the 217th Battalion, CEF.

Regimental lineage 

 Originated on 3 July 1905, as a regiment of infantry in the districts of Assiniboia and Saskatchewan.
 Redesignated on 2 April 1907, as the 95th Regiment and converted to a rifle regiment on 1 May 1908.
 Redesignated on 1 June 1909, as the 95th Saskatchewan Rifles.
 Reorganized on 1 April 1912, into two separate regiments: the 95th (Saskatchewan) Regiment and the 105th Regiment (now The North Saskatchewan Regiment).
 Amalgamated on 15 March 1920, with the 60th Rifles of Canada and redesignated as The South Saskatchewan Regiment.
 Reorganized on 15 May 1924, into five regiments: The Weyburn Regiment, The Saskatchewan Border Regiment, The Regina Rifle Regiment, The South Saskatchewan Regiment (now The Saskatchewan Dragoons) and The Assiniboia Regiment.
 Converted from infantry to artillery on 1 December 1936, and redesignated as the 22nd (Assiniboia) Field Brigade, RCA (now part of the 10th Field Artillery Regiment, RCA).

References 

Former infantry regiments of Canada
Military units and formations established in 1905
Military units and formations disestablished in 1936
Military units and formations of Saskatchewan